Jack Armstrong  (1884–1963) 
was a footballer who played in The Football League for Nottingham Forest between 1905 and 1922.

Armstrong also played cricket for Nottinghamshire Seconds and made 17 appearances in the Minor Counties Championship between 1909 and 1910. 

Armstrong came from a sporting family. His brother Thomas Armstrong played cricket for Nottinghamshire  and another brother Albert played for Forest Reserves on several occasions.

References

English footballers
Nottingham Forest F.C. players
English Football League players
Association football midfielders